Michael Joseph Zofko (born June 8, 1949) is a former American football running back in the National Football League who played for the Detroit Lions and New York Giants. He played college football for the Auburn Tigers.

References

1949 births
Living people
American football running backs
New York Giants players
Detroit Lions players
Auburn Tigers football players